The Phaethontiformes  are an order of birds. They contain one extant family, the tropicbirds (Phaethontidae), and one extinct family Prophaethontidae from the early Cenozoic. Several fossil genera have been described.

The tropicbirds were traditionally grouped in the order Pelecaniformes, which contained the pelicans, cormorants and shags, darters, gannets and boobies and frigatebirds; in the Sibley-Ahlquist taxonomy, the Pelecaniformes were united with other groups into a large "Ciconiiformes". More recently this grouping has been found to be massively paraphyletic (missing closer relatives of its distantly related groups) and split again.

Microscopic analysis of eggshell structure by Konstantin Mikhailov in 1995 found that the eggshells of tropicbirds lacked the covering of thick microglobular material of other Pelecaniformes.

Some early studies in the last decade suggested Phaethontiformes were distantly  related to Procellariiformes,
 but since 2004 they have been placed in Metaves, or in a lineage with no affinities with Procellariiformes, by the results of most recent molecular studies.

Jarvis, et al.'s 2014 paper "Whole-genome analyses resolve early branches in the tree of life of modern birds" aligns the Phaethontiformes most closely with the sunbittern and the kagu of the Eurypygiformes, with these two clades forming the sister group of the "core water birds", the Aequornithes, and the Metaves hypothesis abandoned.

References

 
Bird orders
Seabirds